Mombaccus Mountain is located in the Catskill Mountains of New York. To the south, it looms over the hamlet of Samsonville in the town of Olive. Together with Little Rocky and South Mountain, Mombaccus Mountain is part of a massif dominated by Ashokan High Point. Below its north slope is the Kanape Brook trail, an old wagon road that leads to a saddle between Mombaccus and Ashokan High Point. Big Rosy Bone Knob, a lesser summit, lies southwest of Mombaccus Mountain. According to historian DeWitt Davis, Mombaccus was "noted for huckleberries and bears" and bear traps were dug on its slopes.

The name "Mombaccus" is derived from "Mumbacker," a Dutch version of the Greek "Mombaccus" (mask of Bacchus). This was a reference to an Indian carving of a face (likely the Algonkan bear god Maysingwey) on a sycamore tree where Rochester Creek (formerly known as Mombaccus Creek) enters Rondout Creek in Rochester. The town of Rochester was originally known as Mombaccus, but today that name is used for a hamlet on County Route 3 within Rochester and for one of the tributaries of Rochester Creek. The name Mombaccus was not given to the mountain until some time in the later 19th century. As late as 1919, it was still being referred to by some as "Subbeatty Mountain."

References

Mountains of Ulster County, New York
Mountains of New York (state)